Erich Leie (10 September 1916 – 7 March 1945) was a German Luftwaffe military aviator and wing commander during World War II. As a fighter ace, he is credited with 121 aerial victories claimed in more than 500 combat missions. He claimed 44 on Western Front, 77 on the Eastern Front, including one four-engine bomber.

Born in Kiel, Leie grew up in the Weimar Republic and Nazi Germany. In 1939, he served with Jagdgeschwader 51 (JG 51—51st Fighter Wing) before he was transferred to Jagdgeschwader 2 "Richthofen" (JG 2—2nd Fighter Wing) in early 1940. Flying with this wing, Leie claimed his first aerial victory on 14 May during the Battle of France and received the  Knight's Cross of the Iron Cross on 1 August 1941. In June 1942, he was given command of I. Gruppe of JG 2. In 1943, he transferred back to JG 51 where he commanded I. Gruppe. This unit fought on the Eastern Front where he claimed his 100th aerial victory on 6 November 1943. In December 1944, he was given command of Jagdgeschwader 77 (JG 77—77th Fighter Wing). Leie was killed in action on 7 March 1945. Posthumously, he was promoted to Oberstleutnant (lieutenant colonel) and nominated for the Knight's Cross of the Iron Cross with Oak Leaves.

Early life and career
Leie was born on 10 September 1916 in Kiel, at the time in the Province of Schleswig-Holstein, a province of the Kingdom of Prussia. In August 1939, Leie temporarily led the Reservestaffel of Jagdgeschwader 71 (JG 71—71st Fighter Wing) until he was replaced by Oberleutnant (First Lieutenant) Horst Tietzen on 29 August. The Reservestaffel was a training squadron equipped with the Messerschmitt Bf 109 D-1, at the time based at Bad Aibling and subordinated to the I. Gruppe (1st group) of Jagdgeschwader 51 (JG 51—51st Fighter Wing). On 26 August, during the German mobilization phase, the Reservestaffel was ordered to Fürstenfeldbruck where it was tasked with providing fighter protection over Munich.

World War II
World War II in Europe had begun on Friday 1 September 1939 when German forces invaded Poland. On 21 March 1940, Leie was transferred to III. Gruppe (3rd group) of Jagdgeschwader 2 "Richthofen" (JG 2—2nd Fighter Wing), named after World War I fighter ace Manfred von Richthofen. By October 1940, Leie was serving with the Geschwaderstab (headquarters unit) of JG 2. On 28 November 1940, Leie was wingman of Major (Major) Helmut Wick, Geschwaderkommodore (wing commander) of JG 2, on a mission to the Isle of Weight. Leie claimed a Supermarine Spitfire fighter destroyed, his eleventh aerial victory. On that mission, Wick was killed in action when he was shot down, probably by Flight Lieutenant John Dundas of No. 609 Squadron who was also killed that day.

On 23 July 1941, he claimed six Spitfires shot down in one day, an "ace-in-a-day" achievement, taking his total to 21 aerial victories. For this, Leie was awarded the Knight's Cross of the Iron Cross on 1 August 1941. He received the award from Feldmarschall (Field Marschal) Hugo Sperrle with fellow JG 2 "Richthofen" pilots Leutnant Egon Mayer and Oberleutnant Rudolf Pflanz on that day. The triple award presentation was recorded by the Deutsche Wochenschau (German Weekly Review),  a newsreel series released in the cinemas. By the end of 1941, his total stood at 32 aerial victories. His 32nd claim was a Handley Page Halifax heavy bomber shot down on 30 December in the vicinity of Brest. On 26 January 1942, Leie claimed a Spitfire shot down south of Rame Head. The Spitfire was piloted by Kazimierz Kosinski from the No. 302 Polish Fighter Squadron who was killed in action on a shipping reconnaissance mission that day.

Group commander
On 24 June 1942, Leie was officially appointed as Gruppenkommandeur (group commander) of I. Gruppe of JG 2. Leie thus succeeded Hauptmann Ignaz Prestele in this capacity who had been killed in action on 4 May 1942. This was his last claim on the Western Front.

His injuries required hospitalization. Leie returned to his unit on 2 October 1942. During his convalescence, Oberleutnant Christian Eickhoff temporarily led I. Gruppe. On 13 August, Sperrle had approved Leie's preferential promotion to Hauptmann (captain). The Gruppe saw relatively little action in October. In fear of an Allied invasion on the French Mediterranean coast, I. Gruppe was ordered to Marseille-Marignane airfield on 8 November. There, it was tasked with providing fighter protection over the coastal area. Without engaging in aerial combat, the Gruppe stayed in Southern France until the end of 1942.

Eastern Front
In January 1943, Leie transferred as Gruppenkommandeur to I. Gruppe of JG 51, based on the Eastern Front. Leie had received the transfer-order on 6 January and arrived at his new unit on 17 January which at the time was based at Isotscha  near Nevel. That day, Leie's predecessor as Gruppenkommandeur, Oberleutnant Rudolf Busch, was killed in action when he collided in mid-air with Geschwaderkommodore Oberstleutnant (Lieutenant Colonel) Karl-Gottfried Nordmann. At the time of Leie's arrival on the Eastern Front, Soviet and German forces were engaged in the Battle for Velikiye Luki and in the Battles of Rzhev in the sector of JG 51 area of operation. On 28 January, I. Gruppe was forced to give up its airfield at Isotscha and moved to an airfield west of Oryol. Flying from Oryol, Leie claimed a Mikoyan-Gurevich MiG-3 fighter shot down on 2 February, his first aerial victory on the Eastern Front.

Leie led the Gruppe during the offensive operations leading up to Operation Citadel, which initiated the Battle of Kursk. The battle began on 5 July 1943 with I. Gruppe of JG 51 supporting the German 9th Army in its northern attack on the Kursk salient. For the first days of the operation, I. Gruppe primary task was to provide fighter escort for the bombers of Kampfgeschwader 4, Kampfgeschwader 51 and Kampfgeschwader 53, as well as for the Junkers Ju 87 dive bombers of Sturzkampfgeschwader 1. On the first day of the Zitadelle, Leie claimed his 50th aerial victory, an Il-2 shot down in the vicinity of Maloarkhangelsk.

On 6 November 1943 Leie, by now a Major, recorded his 100th victory. He was the 57th Luftwaffe pilot to achieve the century mark. After a lengthy spell of leave, he returned in late March 1944. On 6 July, during Operation Bagration, he was shot down by Soviet fighters. He baled out over Soviet lines but on descending by parachute, was blown back over German lines. By the end of October 1944, Leie's victory total stood at 117.

Wing commander of JG 77 and death

On 29 December 1944, Leie was appointed Geschwaderkommodore of Jagdgeschwader 77 (JG 77—77th Fighter Wing). He replaced Major Siegfried Freytag in this function who had temporarily assumed command after Major Johannes Wiese was wounded in combat on 25 December. Freytag continued to lead JG 77 until Leie's arrival with the Geschwader on  15 January 1945. Command of his former I. Gruppe of JG 51 was passed to Hauptmann Günther Schack. On 12 January, the Red Army had launched the Vistula–Oder Offensive on the Eastern Front. The offensive required the Luftwaffe to relocate its forces, defeated Army Group A, taking much of Poland and striking deep within the pre-war borders of Germany. JG 77 was one of the first Luftwaffe fighter units ordered to relocate to the Eastern Front on 19 January.

As Geschwaderkommodore, Leie was ordered to Berlin on 22 January 1945 and attended the meeting with Reichsmarschall Hermann Göring which was later dubbed the Fighter Pilots' Mutiny. This was an attempt to reinstate Generalleutnant Adolf Galland as General der Jagdflieger who had been dismissed for outspokenness regarding the Oberkommando der Luftwaffe (Luftwaffe high command), and had been replaced by Oberst Gordon Gollob. The meeting was held at the Haus der Flieger in Berlin and was attended by a number of high-ranking fighter pilot leaders which included Leie, Günther Lützow, Hannes Trautloft, Hermann Graf, Gerhard Michalski, Helmut Bennemann, Kurt Bühligen and Herbert Ihlefeld, and their antagonist Göring supported by his staff Bernd von Brauchitsch and Karl Koller. The fighter pilots, with Lützow taking the lead as spokesman, criticized Göring and made him personally responsible for the decisions taken which effectively had led to the lost air war over Europe.

On 7 March 1945, Leie claimed his last two aerial victories and was killed in action. At 14:56, he claimed a La-5 shot down. Half an hour later, he claimed a Yakovlev Yak-9 fighter west of Bielitz, present-day Bielsko-Biała, but collided in mid-air with the crashing Yak-9 fighter in his Bf 109 G-14/AS (Werknummer 786329—factory number). Posthumously, he was nominated for the Knight's Cross of the Iron Cross with Oak Leaves which was not approved. He was buried at the German war cemetery in Valašské Meziříčí.

Summary of career

Aerial victory claims
According to US historian David T. Zabecki, Leie was credited with 118 aerial victories. Spick also lists him with 118 aerial victories, 75 on the Eastern Front and 43 on the Western Front, claimed in approximately 500 combat missions. Mathews and Foreman, authors of Luftwaffe Aces – Biographies and Victory Claims, researched the German Federal Archives and found records for 121 aerial victory claims, plus one further unconfirmed claim. This figure includes 77 aerial victories on the Eastern Front and 44 over the Western Allies, including one four-engine bomber.

Victory claims were logged to a map-reference (PQ = Planquadrat), for example "PQ 14 West 4911". These sectors were then subdivided into 36 smaller units to give a location area 3 × 4 km in size.

Awards
 German Cross in Gold on 20 October 1942 as Oberleutnant in the I./Jagdgeschwader 2
 Knight's Cross of the Iron Cross on 1 August 1941 as Oberleutnant and pilot in the Stab of I./Jagdgeschwader 2 "Richthofen"

Notes

References

Citations

Bibliography

 
 
 
 
 
 
 
 
 
 
 
 
 
 
 
 
 
 
 
 
 
 
 
 

1916 births
1945 deaths
People from the Province of Schleswig-Holstein
Military personnel from Kiel
German World War II flying aces
Luftwaffe personnel killed in World War II
Recipients of the Gold German Cross
Recipients of the Knight's Cross of the Iron Cross
Victims of aviation accidents or incidents in 1945